Napoleon's Last HQ is a museum housed in the Ferme du Caillou (Caillou Farm) at Genappe, Belgium, in which the Emperor Napoleon stayed the night before the Battle of Waterloo on 18 June 1815. Travelling north, the high road passes pass over the Waterloo battlefield through Waterloo and on to Brussels.

History

In 1815 the farmhouse belonged to Séance de Caioux. Napoleon resided there on the night of the 17/18 of June 1815. It is the site of the breakfast conference at which Napoleon told his marshals, "Wellington is a bad general, the English are bad troops, and this affair is nothing more than eating breakfast".

A day after the battle, the Prussians, vowing that it should never again harbour their former enemy, burnt the farmhouse.

Museum

The museum houses unique pieces, such as the Emperor's camp bed and table he used during the campaign.

Notes

References

External links

Official website

Waterloo Battlefield locations
Buildings and structures in Walloon Brabant
Museums in Walloon Brabant